James Stirling (1835–1917) was a Scottish mechanical engineer. He was Locomotive Superintendent of the Glasgow and South Western Railway and later the South Eastern Railway. Stirling was born on 2 October 1835, a son of Robert Stirling, rector of Galston, East Ayrshire.

Career

Glasgow and South Western Railway
After working for a village millwright he joined the Glasgow and South Western Railway (GSWR) where he was apprenticed to his brother Patrick, who had been Locomotive Superintendent of that railway since 1853. On completion of his apprenticeship, he spent a year as a fitter at Sharp Stewart in Manchester, before returning to the GSWR drawing office at Kilmarnock; he later became works manager. 
On 1 March 1866, his brother Patrick left the GSWR for the Great Northern Railway (GNR), where he became Works Manager at Doncaster, and James was appointed Locomotive Superintendent of the GSWR in his place. Patrick became the Locomotive Superintendent of the GNR from 1 October 1866),

South Eastern Railway 
At the end of June 1878 he left the GSWR for the South Eastern Railway. He retired in 1898 and died in Ashford, Kent in 1917.

Locomotives
Like his brother, James Stirling favoured the domeless boiler, known as the "straightback" and cabs for the enginemen. Although not the first British locomotive engineer to use the 4-4-0 type, he was the first to produce a 4-4-0 which could be regarded as successful, with his G&SWR 6 Class of 1873. Stirling also invented a steam reverser, using it on most of his designs from 1874.

On the South Eastern Railway, Stirling designed just six classes of locomotive in his twenty years – three of these were of the 4-4-0 type for express passenger work, each more capable than the last; his other three classes were an 0-6-0 for goods, an 0-4-4T for suburban passenger, and an 0-6-0T for shunting. At his retirement at the end of 1898, the SER had 459 engines, of which 384 were to Stirling's design, and seven others had been purchased to outside design; ten more to Stirling's design would be built in 1899.

See also
Locomotives of the Glasgow and South Western Railway
 Locomotives of the Southern Railway

Notes

References

 

1835 births
1917 deaths
People from East Ayrshire
Scottish railway mechanical engineers
South Eastern and Chatham Railway people
Glasgow and South Western Railway people
Locomotive builders and designers